Shāh Shujā' (meaning: brave king) may refer to the following:

Shah Shoja Mozaffari, the 14th-century Muzaffarid ruler of Southern Iran
Shah Shuja (Mughal prince) (1616-1661), the second son of Shah Jahan
Shah Shujah Durrani, emir of Afghanistan in 1803–1809 and 1839-1842